Giuliano Modarelli (born 1977) is a guitarist composer and producer from Italy.

Biography 
Born in Milan in 1977, he moved to England in 2000 where he attended Leeds College of Music. After receiving his Bachelor in jazz music in 2003 he became a full-time musician and started playing with bands like Sawa Teen, Raga Nova and Nshwa with which he played in important festivals such as Bestival and Moor Music Festival and on BBC Radio.

In these years he became interested in Indian music and he started studying it with the Indian sitar master Dharambir Singh, sarod maestros Buddhadev Dasgupta and Prattyush Bannerjee.

He is the founder, of the award-winning band Kefaya and the fusion collective Samay with which he has been invited to participate in international festivals like the WOMAD, Latitude, London Jazz Festival, Darbar Festival, Music Port Festival and radio and television shows on BBC 1/2/3/6 and Asian Network and Doordarshan TV UK.

In 2008, with famous tabla player Bickram Ghosh, he composed music for Bollywood films Little Zizou and The Diamond Murders.
In the same year he toured India with Ghosh and percussionist Pete Lockett supporting a musical performance called "East meets West" that made him appear in many Indian national TV programs.

Discography 
Albums
Kefaya - Songs of Our Mothers - 2019 Bella Union

Kefaya - Radio International 2016 Radio International Records_

Sarathy Korwar - Day to Day - 2016 Ninja Tune

Olcay Bayir - Ruya -  2019 ARC Music

Giuliano Modarelli - Englobed - 2012 Manush Records

Sawa Teen
 Sawa Teen – 2004

Samay
 Songs for a Global Journey – 2008

Bickram Ghosh & Pete Lockett
Kingdom of Rhythm - 2008

Kefaya
Radio International - 2016
Songs of our Mothers - 2019

Soundtracks
 Little Zizou – 2008
 The Diamond murders – 2008
 Naga The Ethernal Yogi - 2016 composer 
https://www.imdb.com/name/nm8290277/

References

External links

1977 births
Living people
Italian musicians
Lead guitarists
Italian jazz guitarists
Italian male guitarists
Jazz fusion guitarists
Musicians from Milan
21st-century guitarists
21st-century Italian male musicians
Male jazz musicians